Antipodocottus galatheae, the Galathea sculpin, is a species of marine ray-finned fish belonging to the family Cottidae, the typical sculpins. This species found on the continental shelf around New Zealand. It has also been recorded off Tasmania, New South Wales and Queensland.

Taxonomy
Antipodocottus galatheae was first formally described in 1952 by the American ichthyologist Rolf Ling Bolin. It is the type species of the genus Antipodocottus. The specific name is taken from the Danish research ship HMDS Galathea from which the holotype was collected.

References

 Tony Ayling & Geoffrey Cox, Collins Guide to the Sea Fishes of New Zealand,  (William Collins Publishers Ltd, Auckland, New Zealand 1982) 

galatheae
Endemic marine fish of New Zealand
Fish described in 1952
Taxa named by Rolf Ling Bolin